Larkin Seiple (born 1985) is an American cinematographer. He was cinematographer for Cop Car and both of the director duo Daniels' feature films, Swiss Army Man and Everything Everywhere All at Once.

Biography
Seiple grew up in Seattle, Washington, attending high school at Seattle Academy of Arts and Sciences, and later attended Emerson College.

Filmography
Feature films

Music videos
 Theophilus London - "Flying Overseas" (2010)
 Disturbed - "Another Way to Die" (2010)
 Disturbed - "Asylum" (2010)
 My Chemical Romance - "Na Na Na (Na Na Na Na Na Na Na Na Na)" (2010)
 We the Kings - "We'll Be a Dream" (2010)
 Emily Osment - "Lovesick" (2010)
 Sia - "I'm in Here" (2010)
 Katy Perry - "The One That Got Away" (2011)
 Rihanna - "Diamonds" (2012)
 Childish Gambino - "Sweatpants" (2013)
 DJ Snake - "Turn Down for What" (2013)
 Yeah Yeah Yeahs - "Despair" (2013)
 Flying Lotus - "Never Catch Me" (2014)
 Arcade Fire - "We Exist" (2014)
 Queens of the Stone Age - "Smooth Sailing" (2014)
 Childish Gambino - "This Is America" (2018)
 Benny Blanco and Juice Wrld - "Graduation" (2019)

Awards
Seiple won the 2015 MTV Video Music Award for Best Cinematography for "Never Catch Me" by Flying Lotus.

References

External links
 Official website
 

1985 births
American cinematographers
Living people
Emerson College alumni